Muhlenbergia richardsonis, known by the common name mat muhly, is a species of grass. It is native to North America, where it can be found throughout much of Canada, Alaska, the western half of the contiguous United States through California, and in Baja California, Mexico.

Description
Muhlenbergia richardsonis is a rhizomatous perennial grass producing knotted, mat-forming stems up to about 40 centimeters long. The blue-green leaves are up to 5 or 6 centimeters long. The inflorescence is a narrow cylindrical series of tightly appressed branches bearing gray-green, single-flowered spikelets 2 or 3 millimeters long.

Habitat
Muhlenbergia richardsonis grows in a number of habitat types including talus and meadows in alpine mountain environments, wet alkaline and saline soils, desert arroyos, chaparral, forests and woodlands. It is a species of botanical interest for being an alpine plant utilizing C4 carbon fixation, reported at higher altitudes than any other C4 plant in North America.

Prairie fens
This grass is the only known food plant for the leafhopper Flexamia huroni, which lives only in Michigan. The grass is limited to alkaline prairie fens in the area, an increasingly rare habitat type, making the leafhopper a species of concern itself.

References

External links
USDA Plants Profile - Muhlenbergia richardsonis
Grass Manual Treatment
US Forest Service Fire Ecology
Muhlenbergia richardsonis - Photo gallery

richardsonis
Alpine flora
Native grasses of California
Grasses of Canada
Grasses of the United States
Flora of the Western United States
Flora of the Cascade Range
Flora of the California desert regions
Flora of the Great Basin
Flora of the Rocky Mountains
Flora of the Sierra Nevada (United States)
Flora of Alaska
Flora of Michigan
Natural history of the Transverse Ranges
North American desert flora
Flora without expected TNC conservation status